The AppleLink Package Compression Format, or AppleLink Package for short, is an obsolete file format used on Apple Inc.'s defunct AppleLink online service as a file transfer and file compression format. It was not particularly efficient and was easily outperformed by contemporary systems like StuffIt and Compact Pro, and remained rare outside AppleLink.

References

Archive formats